More than 405 newspapers were founded in Washington, D.C., during the 18th and 19th centuries. They included daily, weekly, and monthly newspapers, mostly published in English, with a few in German and one in French. Many reported on news of national government affairs, since Washington, D.C., is the capital seat of the United States of America.  Thomas Jefferson helped establish some of the early newspapers. During the American Civil War, some newspapers were founded and published in military camps and hospitals within Washington, D.C., including Brookland, Tenleytown, Carver General Hospital, Finley General Hospital, Armory Square Hospital,  and Kalorama. Most of these newspapers ceased publication before 1900, but a few survived to the 20th century, including the Evening Star, and at least one to the 21st century: The Washington Post.

Newspapers by founding date

1700s
Georgetown, originally part of the state of Maryland, was the first populated place in Washington, D.C. The first newspapers appeared in Georgetown, which became an independently municipal government within the District of Columbia, along with the City of Washington, the City of Alexandria (retroceeded to Virginia in 1846), and the newly created County of Washington and County of Alexandria (retroceded to Virginia in 1847, now Arlington County, Virginia).  See Defunct newspapers of Virginia for newspapers that were part of the District and then became part of Virginia.

18001829
Between 1800 and 1829, 68 newspapers were founded in the area that is now Washington, D.C.  All of these newspapers ceased printing by 1891.

18301859

There were 143 newspapers founded in Washington, D.C. between 1830 and 1859.  The Daily Evening Star, founded in 1852, continued publication under several different names until it ceased publication in 1981, as the Washington Star.

18601899

There were 184 newspapers founded in Washington, D.C. between 1860 and 1899.  This included newspapers found at Union military camps and hospitals during the American Civil War.  The Washington Post, founded in 1877, continues to be published as a national newspaper in the 21st century.  Several African American-owned newspapers were founded during reconstruction in Washington, D.C., including The National Savings Bank in 1868 and the New National Era and New Era in 1870.

Front pages

References

Bibliography
 
 
 
 
 

Defunct newspapers published in Washington, D.C.
Newspapers published in Washington, D.C.
Washington, D.C.-related lists
Defunct newspapers published in the United States